Ingeborg Hermine Morath (27 May 1923 – 30 January 2002) was an Austrian photographer. In 1953, she joined the Magnum Photos Agency, founded by top photographers in Paris, and became a full photographer with the agency in 1955. Morath was the third wife of playwright Arthur Miller; their daughter is screenwriter/director Rebecca Miller.

Biography

Early years (1923–1945)
Morath was born in Graz, Austria, to Mathilde (Wiesler) and Edgar Morath, scientists whose work took them to different laboratories and universities in Europe during her childhood. Her parents had converted from Catholicism to Protestantism. First educated in French-speaking schools, Morath relocated in the 1930s with her family to Darmstadt, a German intellectual center, and then to Berlin, where Morath's father directed a laboratory specializing in wood chemistry. Morath was registered at the Luisenschule near Bahnhof Friedrichstraße.

Morath's first encounter with avant-garde art was the Entartete Kunst (Degenerate Art) exhibition organized by the Nazi Party in 1937, which sought to inflame public opinion against modern art. "I found a number of these paintings exciting and fell in love with Franz Marc's Blue Horse", Morath later wrote. "Only negative comments were allowed, and thus began a long period of keeping silent and concealing thoughts."

After finishing high school, Morath passed the Abitur and was obliged to complete six months of service for the Reichsarbeitsdienst (Reich Labour Service) before entering Berlin University. At university, Morath studied languages. She became fluent in French, English and Romanian in addition to her native German (to these she later added Spanish, Russian and Chinese). "I studied where I could find a quiet space, in the University and the Underground stations that served as air-raid shelters. I did not join the Studentenschaft (Student Body)."

Toward the end of World War II, Morath was drafted for factory service in Tempelhof, a neighbourhood of Berlin, alongside Ukrainian prisoners of war. During an attack on the factory by Russian bombers, she fled on foot to Austria. In later years, Morath refused to photograph war, preferring to work on stories that showed its consequences.

Middle years (1945–1962)

After the war, Morath worked as a translator and journalist. In 1948, she was hired by Warren Trabant, first as Vienna Correspondent and later as the Austrian editor, for Heute, an illustrated magazine published by the Office of War Information in Munich. Morath encountered photographer Ernst Haas in post-war Vienna, and brought his work to Trabant's attention. Working together for Heute, Morath wrote articles to accompany Haas' pictures. In 1949, Morath and Haas were invited by Robert Capa to join the newly founded Magnum Photos in Paris, where she started as an editor. Working with contact sheets sent into the Magnum office by founding member Henri Cartier-Bresson fascinated Morath. "I think that in studying his way of photographing I learned how to photograph myself, before I ever took a camera into my hand."

Morath was briefly married to the British journalist Lionel Birch and relocated to London in 1951. That same year, she began to photograph during a visit to Venice. "It was instantly clear to me that from now on I would be a photographer", she wrote. "As I continued to photograph I became quite joyous. I knew that I could express the things I wanted to say by giving them form through my eyes." Morath applied for an apprenticeship with Simon Guttman, who was then an editor for Picture Post and running the picture-agency Report. When Guttman asked what Morath wanted to photograph, and why, she answered that "after the isolation of Nazism I felt I had found my language in photography." After Morath had spent several months working as Guttman's secretary, she had an opportunity to take photographs. She sold her first photographs - of opening nights, exhibitions, inaugurations, etc. - under the pseudonym "Egni Tharom", her name spelled backwards.

Morath divorced Birch and returned to Paris to pursue a career in photography. In 1953, after Morath presented her first large picture story, on the Worker Priests of Paris, to Capa, he invited her to join Magnum as a photographer. Her first assignments were stories that did not interest "the big boys." She went to London on an early assignment to photograph the residents of Soho and Mayfair. Morath's portrait of Mrs. Eveleigh Nash, from that assignment, is among her best-known works.  At Capa's suggestion, in 1953–54, Morath worked with Cartier-Bresson as a researcher and assistant.  In 1955 she was invited to become a full member of Magnum Photos. During the late 1950s, Morath traveled widely, covering stories in Europe, the Middle East, Africa, the United States, and South America, for such publications as Holiday, Paris Match, and Vogue. In 1955 she published Guerre à la Tristesse, photographs of Spain, with Robert Delpire, followed by De la Perse à l'Iran, photographs of Iran, in 1958. Morath published more than thirty monographs during her lifetime.

Like many Magnum members, Morath worked as a stills photographer on numerous motion picture sets. Having met director John Huston while she was living in London, Morath worked on several of his films. Huston's Moulin Rouge (1952) was one of Morath's earliest assignments, and her first time working in a film studio. When Morath confessed to Huston that she had only one roll of color film to work with and asked for his help, Huston bought three more rolls for her, and occasionally waved to her to indicate the right moments to step in with her camera. Huston later wrote of Morath that she "is a high priestess of photography. She has the rare ability to penetrate beyond surfaces and reveal what makes her subject tick."

In 1959, while photographing the making of The Unforgiven, starring Audrey Hepburn, Burt Lancaster, and Audie Murphy, Morath accompanied Huston and his friends duck hunting on a mountain lake outside Durango, Mexico. Photographing the excursion, Morath saw through her telephoto lens that Murphy's companion had capsized their boat  from shore. She could see that Murphy was stunned, and the men were struggling. A skilled swimmer, Morath swam out, stripped down and used her bra straps to haul the two men ashore .

Morath worked again with Huston in 1960 on the set of The Misfits, a film featuring Marilyn Monroe, Clark Gable and Montgomery Clift, with a screenplay by Arthur Miller. Magnum Photos had been given exclusive rights to photograph the making of the movie, and Morath and Cartier-Bresson were the first of nine photographers to work on location outside Reno, Nevada during the process. Morath met Miller while working on The Misfits.

Marriage and family
Morath married Arthur Miller on 17 February 1962 and relocated permanently to the United States. Miller and Morath's first child, Rebecca, was born in September 1962. The couple's second child Daniel was born in 1966 with Down syndrome and was institutionalized shortly after his birth. Rebecca Miller is a film director, actress, and writer who is married to the actor Daniel Day-Lewis.

First decade
Morath's achievements during her first decade of work as a photographer are significant. Along with Eve Arnold, she was among the first women members of Magnum Photos, which remains to this day a predominantly male organization. Many critics have written of the playful surrealism that characterizes Morath's work from this period. Morath attributed this to the long conversations she had with Cartier-Bresson during their travels in Europe and the United States. Morath's work was motivated by a fundamental humanism, shaped as much by her experience of war as by its lingering shadow over post-war Europe. In Morath's mature work, she documents the endurance of the human spirit under situations of extreme duress, as well as its manifestations of ecstasy and joy.

Later years (1962–2002)
After re-locating to the United States, during the 1960s and 1970s Morath worked closer to home, raising a family with Miller and working with him on several projects. Their first collaboration was the book In Russia (1969), which, together with Chinese Encounters (1979), described their travels and meetings in the Soviet Union and the People's Republic of China. In the Country, published in 1977, was an intimate look at their immediate surroundings. For both Miller, who had lived much of his life in New York City, and Morath, who had come to the US from Europe, the Connecticut countryside offered a fresh encounter with America.

Reflecting on the importance of Morath's linguistic gifts, Miller wrote that "travel with her was a privilege because [alone] I would never been able to penetrate that way." In their travels Morath translated for Miller, while his literary work was the entrée for Morath to encounter an international artistic elite. The Austrian photographer Kurt Kaindl, her long-time colleague, noted that "their cooperation develop[ed] without outward pressure and is solely motivated by their common interest in the people and the respective cultural sphere, a situation that corresponds to Inge Morath's working style, since she generally feels inhibited by assignments."

Morath sought out, befriended, and photographed artists and writers. During the 1950s she  photographed artists for Robert Delpire's magazine L'Oeil, including Jean Arp and Alberto Giacometti.  She met the artist Saul Steinberg in 1958. When she went to his home to make a portrait, Steinberg came to the door wearing a mask which he had fashioned from a paper bag. Over a period of several years, they collaborated on a series of portraits, inviting individuals and groups of people to pose for Morath wearing Steinberg's masks. Another long-term project was Morath's documentation of many of the most important productions of Arthur Miller's plays.

Some of Morath's signal achievements are in portraiture, including posed images of celebrities as well as fleeting images of anonymous passersby. Her pictures of Boris Pasternak's home, Pushkin's library, Chekhov's house, Mao Zedong's bedroom, as well as artists' studios and cemetery memorials, are permeated with the spirit of invisible people still present. The writer Philip Roth, whom Morath photographed in 1965, described her as "the most engaging, sprightly, seemingly harmless voyeur I know. If you're one of her subjects, you hardly know your guard is down and your secret recorded until it's too late. She is a tender intruder with an invisible camera."

As the scope of her projects grew, Morath prepared extensively by studying the language, art, and literature of a country to encounter its culture fully. Although photography was the primary means through which Morath found expression, it was but one of her skills. In addition to the many languages in which she was fluent, Morath was also a prolific diary and letter-writer; her dual gift for words and pictures made her unusual among her colleagues. Morath wrote extensively, and often amusingly, about her photographic subjects. Although she rarely published these texts during her lifetime, posthumous publications have focused upon this aspect of her work.  They have brought together her photographs with journal writings, caption notes, and other archival materials relating to her various projects.

During the 1980s and 1990s, Morath continued to pursue both assignments and independent projects. The film Copyright by Inge Morath was made by German filmmaker Sabine Eckhard in 1992, and was one of several films selected for a presentation of Magnum Films at the Berlin International Film Festival in 2007. Eckhard filmed Morath at home and in her studio, and in New York and Paris with her colleagues, including Cartier-Bresson, Elliott Erwitt and others. In 2002, working with film director Regina Strassegger, Morath fulfilled a long-held wish to revisit the lands of her ancestors, along the borderlands of Styria and Slovenia. This mountainous region, once part of the Austro-Hungarian Empire, had become the faultline between two conflicting ideologies after World War II and until 1991, when attempts at rapprochement led to conflict on both sides of the border. The book Last Journey (2002), and Strasseger's film Grenz Räume (Border Space, 2002), document Morath's visits to her homeland during the final years of her life.

Death
Morath Miller died of cancer on January 30, 2002, at the age of 78.

Honors and legacy
 2003, her family established the Inge Morath Foundation to preserve and share her legacy.
 2002, members of Magnum Photos established the Inge Morath Award in honor of their colleague as an annual award.  It is administered by the Inge Morath Foundation, and is given to a woman photographer under the age of 30, to support her work towards the completion of a long-term project.
 1992 Great Austrian State Prize for Photography.
 1984 Doctor Honoris Causa Fine Arts, University of Connecticut, Hartford, US.
 1983 State of Michigan Senate Resolution NO 295; Tribute to Inge Morath.
 Since 2012 Salzburg, Austria has an "Inge-Morath-Platz" in tribute to the photographer. It is also the location of the Fotohof, a photographic institution which has collaborated with her since the beginning of the 1980s 
 In 2020 ANNOUNCING THE 2020 INGE MORATH AWARD

Quotations
 "Photography is a strange phenomenon ... You trust your eye and cannot help but bare your soul.
"Inge Morath was, above all, a traveller ... [H]er approach to a story was 'to let it grow', without any apparent concern for narrative structure, trusting in her experience and interests to shape her work rather than in an editorial formula ... She unsentimentally made pictures that were guided by her relationship to a place. These relationships were invariably intimate and long-lasting; she regularly revisited the places she chose to photograph and learned the relevant language ... Similarly, her photographs of people are born of intimacy without sentimentality. It is as if the presentation of relationships takes the place of story structure, and her work is best understood as an ongoing series of observations of the life she made for herself."

Solo exhibitions

 2008 Well Disposed and Trying to See: Inge Morath and Arthur Miller in China, University of Michigan Museum of Art, Ann Arbor, US.
 2004 Inge Morath: The Road to Reno, Chicago Cultural Center, Illinois, US.
 2004 Inge Morath: Chinese Encounters, Pingyao International Photography Festival, Pingyao, China.
 2003 Exposition, Henri Cartier-Bresson Foundation, Paris, France.
 2002 Inge Morath: Danube, City Gallery of Russe, Russe, Bulgaria.
 2002 Inge Morath: New York, Galerie Fotohof, Salzburg, Austria; Stadt Passau, Europäische; Wochen, Germany ESWE Forum, Wiesbaden; Esther Woerdehoff Galerie, Paris, France; Amerikahaus Tübingen, Germany.
 1999 Retrospective, Kunsthalle Wien, Austria; FNAC Etoile, Paris, France; FNAC, Barcelona, Spain.
 1999 Spain in the Fifties, Museo del Cabilde, Montevideo, Uruguay.
 1998 Inge Morath: Danube, Festival of Central European Culture, London, UK; Museen d. Stadt Regensburg, Regensburg, Germany.
 1998 Retrospective, Edinburgh Festival, Edinburgh, UK; Museum of Photography in Charleroi, Belgium; Municipal Gallery, Pamplona, Spain.
 1998 Celebrating 75 Years Leica Gallery, New York, US.
 1997 Retrospective Kunsthal, Rotterdam, Netherlands.
 1997 Inge Morath: Danube, Keczkemet Museum, Esztergom Museum, Hungary
 1997 Photographs 1950s to 1990s, Tokyo Museum of Photography, Tokyo, Japan
 1996 Women to Women, Takashimaya Gallery, Tokyo, Japan
 1996 Inge Morath: Danube, Neues Schauspielhaus, Berlin, Germany; Leica Gallery, New York, US; Galeria Fotoforum, Bolzano, Italy.
 1995 Spain in the fifties, Museo de Arte Contemporaneo, Madrid, Spain; Museo de Navarra, Pamplona, Spain.
 1994 Spain in the fifties, Spanish Institute, New York, US
 1992/94  Retrospective, Neue Galerie Linz, Austria ;America House, Frankfurt, Germany; Hardenberg Gallery, Velbert, Germany; Galerie Fotogramma, Milano, Italy; Royal Photographic Society, Bath, UK; Smith Gallery and Museum, Stirling, UK; America House, Berlin, Germany; Hradcin Gallery, Prague, Czech Republic.
 1991 Portraits, Kolbe Museum Berlin, Germany; Rupertinum Museum Salzburg, Austria
 1989 Portraits, Burden Gallery, Aperture Foundation, New York, New York, US; Norwich Cathedral, Norwich, UK; American Cultural Center, Brussels, Belgium.
 1988 Retrospective, Union of Photojournalists, Moscow, Russia; Sala del Canal Museum, Madrid, Spain; Rupertinum Museum, Salzburg, Austria.
 1984 Salesman in Beijing, Hong Kong Theatre Festival.
 1979 Inge Morath: Photographs of China, Grand Rapids Art Museum, Michigan, US.
 1964 Inge Morath: Photographs, Gallery 104, Art Institute of Chicago, Illinois, US.

Monographs
 1955 Guerre à la Tristesse. Delpire, France.
 1956 Fiesta in Pamplona. Universe Books, US.
 1956 Venice Observed. Reynal & Co., US.
 1958 De la Perse à l'Iran. Robert Delpire, France.
 1960 Bring Forth the Children: A Journey to the Forgotten People of Europe and the Middle East. McGraw-Hill, US.
 1967 Le Masque (Drawings by Saul Steinberg). Maeght Editeur, France.
 1969 In Russia. Viking Press, US.
 1972 In Russia Penguin. 
 1973 East West Exercises. Simon Walker & Co., US.
 1975 Grosse Photographen unserer Zeit:  Inge Morath. C.J. Bucher Verlag, Switzerland.
 1977 In the Country. Viking Press, US.
 1979 Inge Morath: Photographs of China. Grand Rapids Art Museum, US.
 1979 Chinese Encounters. with Arthur Miller. Straus & Giroux, US.
 1981 Bilder aus Wien: Der Liebe Augustin. Reich Verlag, Switzerland.
 1984 Salesman in Beijing. with Arthur Miller. Viking Press, US. 
 1986 Portraits. Aperture, US. 
 1991 Russian Journal. Aperture Foundation, US. 
 1992 Inge Morath: Photographs 1952 to 1992. Otto Müller/Verlag, Austria.
 1994 Inge Morath: Spain in the Fifties. Arte con Texto, Spain.
 1995 Donau. Verlag, Austria. 
 1996 Woman to Woman. Magnum Photos, Japan.
 1999 Inge Morath: Portraits. Verlag, Austria.
 1999 Arthur Miller:  Photographed by Inge Morath. FNAC, Spain.
 1999 Inge Morath: Life as a Photographer. Kehayoff Books, Germany. 
 2000 Saul Steinberg Masquerade. Viking Studio, US. 
 2002 New York. Otto Müller/Verlag, Austria. 
 2003 Inge Morath: Last Journey Prestel. 
 2006 The Road to Reno. Steidl, Germany. 
 2009 Inge Morath: Iran. Steidl, Germany. 
 2009 Inge Morath: First Color. Steidl, Germany. 
 2015 History Travels Badly. London: Fishbar. 
 2016 Inge Morath: On Style. Abrams, US. 
 2018 Inge Morath: Magnum Legacy''. Prestel, US.

See also
 List of Austrian artists and architects
 List of Austrians
 List of street photographers

References

External links
 
 Inge Morath Photographs and Papers. General Collection, Beinecke Rare Book and Manuscript Library, Yale University.

1923 births
2002 deaths
Austrian women photographers
Magnum photographers
Austrian photojournalists
Street photographers
Photography in China
Photography in Iran
Photography in Russia
Photography in Spain
Photography in the Soviet Union
20th-century Austrian women artists
20th-century photographers
20th-century women photographers
Reich Labour Service members
Women photojournalists